Withoutabox was a website founded in January 2000 by David Straus, Joe Neulight and Charles Neulight which allowed independent filmmakers to self-distribute their films. The first product launched was the International Film Festival Submission system. Withoutabox worked with film festivals and filmmakers all over the world. In January 2008, Withoutabox was acquired by IMDb, a subsidiary of Amazon.

The Withoutabox website offered filmmakers a platform to search over 3000 film festivals on five continents and to submit their films to over 850 film festivals worldwide, including festivals such as Sundance and the Toronto International Film Festival.

Festivals could request submissions via the web and manage incoming submissions electronically, instead of the traditional route of sending in screener DVDs via mail. This allowed festivals to market their event to over 400,000 active filmmakers already on the Withoutabox platform, accept submission fees from them electronically, and automatically notify filmmakers for acceptance into their event. Other services included: streaming on the Internet via IMDb, and selling DVDs and video-on-demand downloads on Amazon.com via CreateSpace.

As of October 30, 2019, the website is no longer in service.

Controversy
Withoutabox has attracted criticism in the years following its takeover in 2008 by IMDB, owned in turn by Amazon. Some filmmakers and festivals alike have accused the company of excessive charges, uncompetitive practices, outdated technology and the usual claims of aggressive litigation leveled at Amazon.

Partners (partial list)
Sundance Film Festival
Slamdance Film Festival
Cannes Film Festival
International Film Awards Berlin
Toronto International Film Festival
AFI Fest
Los Angeles Film Festival
Mill Valley Film Festival
Seattle International Film Festival
Detroit Windsor International Film Festival
Canadian Short Screenplay Competition
Arizona International Film Festival
Adelaide International Film Festival

References

External links

 "Why Withoutbox is Killing Indie Film Festivals", 2013, Festivals Against Withoutabox (Withoutaboxsucks.com)

American film websites
Amazon (company) acquisitions